Eddontenajon is an unincorporated settlement in the Stikine Country of the northwestern British Columbia Interior in Canada.  It is located along the Stewart-Cassiar Highway on the northeast side of Eddontenajon Lake and comprises a small commercial centre as well as the community. It should not be confused with the original Eddontenajon Post Office, now renamed Iskut which is a few miles farther north at the north end of the lake.

The name means "child walking in the water" in the Tahltan language.

References

See also
 Eddontenajon/Iskut Village Airport (CBU2)

Stikine Country
Unincorporated settlements in British Columbia
Tahltan